Fedor Dmitriev (born 19 November 1984) is a Russian former professional basketball player. During his playing career, at a height of 2.05 m (6'8 ") tall, he played at the small forward and power forward positions. He was also a member of the senior Russian national team.

Early years
Born in Leningrad, Soviet Union, Dmitriev played basketball with the youth clubs of Pulkovo St. Petersburg. He then played with the club's men's team, from 1999 to 2002.

Professional career
Dmitriev spent most of his pro club career playing with teams in his native Russia. He won the Russian Cup title with Ural Great Perm in 2004. In the 2008–09 season, he averaged 9.3 points and 3.2 rebounds per game for Triumph Lyubertsy. In March 2011, he was sent on a loan from Khimki Moscow Region to Krasnye Krylya, until the end of the season. 

While he was a member of Khimki Moscow Region and Asseco Gdynia, he played in Europe's premier basketball competition, the EuroLeague. On 11 November 2014 he signed with Dzūkija of the Latvian League.

National team career
Dmitriev played with the Russian junior national teams between 2002 and 2004, most notably appearing at the 2002 FIBA Europe Under-18 Championship, and the 2004 FIBA Europe Under-20 Championship's qualification phase.

Dmitriev was also a member of the senior Russian national team. He was named to Russia's 2009 EuroBasket team, and he saw action in two games with the team. Although the Russians finished a disappointing seventh in that tournament, they were later awarded a wild card to the 2010 FIBA World Championship.

References

External links
EuroLeague.net Profile
FIBA Archive Profile
FIBA Europe Profile
Eurobasket.com Profile
Draftexpress.com Profile

1984 births
Living people
Asseco Gdynia players
BC Khimki players
BC Krasnye Krylia players
BC Spartak Saint Petersburg players
BC Zenit Saint Petersburg players
Centers (basketball)
KK Włocławek players
Koroivos B.C. players
PBC Ural Great players
Power forwards (basketball)
Russian men's basketball players
Small forwards